Donald James Murray (born 18 January 1946) is a Scottish former professional footballer. A Scotland under-23 international, Murray spent the majority of his career playing for Cardiff City where he made over 400 appearances in all competitions during a thirteen-year spell. He also played for Swansea City, Heart of Midlothian and Newport County.

Club career

Born in Elgin, Moray, Murray began his career at Cardiff City, making his debut at the age of 17 years and 113 days old, against Middlesbrough in May 1963. Fully establishing himself in the 1964–65 season he went on to hold a first team spot with the Bluebirds for a decade, including being an ever-present for three of the seasons, and currently holds the club record for consecutive league appearances with 146 games between May 1968 to November 1971. Murray was also a member of the Cardiff squad that reached the European Cup Winners Cup semi-final in the 1967–68 season.

Cardiff often received offers from higher clubs for Murray but he decided to remain with Cardiff for the majority of his career. He had a short loan spell at Swansea City in his last year with the club before returning to Scotland for a year with Heart of Midlothian for a fee of £15,000. He joined Newport County the following year, linking up with former Cardiff manager Jimmy Scoular.

International career

During his career, Murray gained one Scotland under-23 cap.

Honours
Cardiff City

 Welsh Cup Winner: 9
 1964, 1965, 1967, 1968, 1969, 1970, 1971, 1973, 1974
 Welsh Cup Runner-up: 1
 1972

References

1946 births
Living people
People from Elgin, Moray
Scottish footballers
Association football defenders
Cardiff City F.C. players
Swansea City A.F.C. players
Heart of Midlothian F.C. players
Newport County A.F.C. players
Barry Town United F.C. players
English Football League players
Scotland under-23 international footballers
Sportspeople from Moray